Holy Cow! Press is an independent publisher based in Duluth, Minnesota. Founded in 1977, they have published more than 125 books.

The press publishes between three and five new books each year, in genres including poetry, fiction, memoir, and biography. Their focus is on writers from the American Midwest, a "territory traditionally ignored by larger indie publishers," according to founder and publisher Jim Perlman, who runs the press out of his home. He also focuses on publishing Native American authors and thematic anthologies.

Selected publications

Poetry
 Natalie Goldberg (1980), Chicken & In Love
 Joyce Sutphen (2004), Naming the Stars
 Jane Yolen (2011), Things to Say to a Dead Man: Poems at the End of a Marriage and After
 Gary Boelhower (2017), Naming Rites
 Crystal Spring Gibbins (2017), Now/Here
 Kimberly Blaeser (2019), Copper Yearning
 Warren Woessner (2019), Exit-Sky
 Richard Terrill (2020), What Falls Away Is Always
 Jane Yolen (2021), Kaddish: Before the Holocaust and After
 Ingrid Andersson (2022), Jordemoder: Poems of a Midwife
 Gordon Henry (2022), Spirit Matters: White Clay, Red Exits, Distant Others

Fiction
 Joan Henrik (2017), Winds & Currents: Native American Stories, Told and Retold
 Miriam Karmel (2017), Subtle Variations and Other Stories
 Thomas D. Peacock (2020), The Wolf's Trail: An Ojibwe Story, Told by Wolves
 Jim Heynen (2021), The Youngest Boy: Stories

Memoir
 Brenda Ueland (1996), ME: A Memoir
 Amy Lou Jenkins (2010), Every Natural Fact: Five Seasons of Open-Air Parenting
 Fred Amram (2016), We're in America Now: A Survivor's Stories
 Michael Fedo (2018), Don't Quit Your Day Job: The Adventures of a Midlist Author

Biography
 Daniel Lancaster (2008), John Beargrease: The Legend of Minnesota's North Shore

Anthologies
 Walt Whitman: The Measure of His Song, 3rd edition (2019), edited by Jim Perlman, Ed Folsom, Dan Campion.

Other
 Patricia Hoolihan (2000), Teen Girls Only! Daily Meditations for Teenage Girls
 Sara Balbin, Thelma Nayquonabe, and James R. Bailey (2012), Spirit of the Ojibwe: Images of Lac Courte Oreilles Elders
 Sarah M. Brokke (2015), Portrait of an Artist: Paintings 
 Patricia Hoolihan (2021), Hands and Heart Together: Daily Meditations for Caregivers

References

External links 
Official website

Book publishing companies based in Minnesota
Poetry publishers
Literary publishing companies